Khalifabad (also Romanized as Khalīfābād) is a village in Karimabad Rural District, Sharifabad District, Pakdasht County, Tehran Province, Iran. At the 2006 census, its population was 125, in 35 families.

References 

Populated places in Pakdasht County